Mirta Zaida Lobato (Córdoba, May 1, 1948) is an Argentine historian, essayist, and full professor specializing in the social, cultural and political history of the world of work and gender relations in Argentina and Latin America in the 20th century. Lobato was the founder of "Área Interdisciplinaria de Estudios de la Mujer" (English: Interdisciplinary Area of Women's Studies) (AIEM). She was awarded a Guggenheim Fellowship in 2006.

Early life and education
Mirta Zaida Lobato was born in Córdoba, Argentina, May 1, 1948.

She completed her secondary studies at the Escuela Normal Nacional Regional República del Ecuador in the city of Frías, Santiago del Estero. Later, she moved to Buenos Aires where she worked in different industrial and commercial activities. She studied at the Faculty of Philosophy and Letters of the University of Buenos Aires (UBA). In 1999, she presented her doctoral thesis at the Faculty of Philosophy and Letters of UBA entitled, La vida en las fábricas: trabajo, protesta y política en una comunidad obrera, Berisso (1904-1970) (English: Life in the factories: work, protest and politics in a working class community, Berisso (1904-1970)) and defended it in 2000, earning a Ph.D. in history.

Career and research
In 1979, she obtained the title of professor in history, Faculty of Philosophy and Letters. Between 1982 and 1985, she worked in middle schools and teacher training institutes in Buenos Aires Province.

She is an associate professor at the UBA, specializing in social, cultural and political history of the world of work and gender relations in Argentina and Latin America in the 20th century, and a researcher at the "Programa de Estudios de Historia Económica y Social Americana" (English: Economic History Study Program and Social American) (PEHESA) since its incorporation to the Faculty of Philosophy and Letters of the UBA; she is currently a member of its board of directors and between 1997 and 1998, she coordinated its activities. She was part of the group of researchers who created the "Instituto Interdisciplinario de Estudios de Género" (English: Interdisciplinary Institute for Gender Studies) (IIEGE) at this faculty, where she directs the activities of the "Archivo Imágenes y Palabras de Mujeres" (English: Women's Images and Words Archive) (APIM).

She was part of the founding group and the editorial committee of the history magazine, Entrepasados, and is a member of the editorial committee of the magazine, Mora, of the Interdisciplinary Institute for Gender Studies of the Faculty of Philosophy and Letters of UBA.

Since 1985, she has been a professor of Argentine History at the Faculty of Philosophy and Letters of UBA, and has taught doctoral and postgraduate courses at various centers of higher education, such as UBA, National University of La Plata, National University of Rosario, University of San Andrés, Latin American Faculty of Social Sciences, National University of Mar del Plata, National University of General San Martín, University of the Republic (Uruguay), University of Chile, and University of Cologne (Germany).

In 1992, Lobato founded the "Área Interdisciplinaria de Estudios de la Mujer" (English: Interdisciplinary Area of Women's Studies) (AIEM), bringing together professors from the areas of Anthropology, Arts, Classics, Education, History, Languages, and Philosophy. At the Interdisciplinary Institute for Gender Studies (IIEGE) of the Faculty of Philosophy and Letters, she founded and directs the Women's Words and Images Archive (APIM) working group whose objectives are to value research in the human sciences, recover and preserve words and images of women, promote democratization in access to information, and favor the teaching of history from a perspective that integrates the gender dimension, as well as favor equal opportunities in education without distinctions of gender, race, social class, or age.

Personal life
Lobato married the social historian Juan Suriano (1948-2018), an expert on Argentine anarchism. They have a son, Lisandro Martín Suriano.

Awards and honours
 2006, Guggenheim Fellowship

Selected works

Books
  (co-author)
 
  (with Juan Suriano)
 
 
 
 
  (co-author)
  (Participation in collective work.)
 
  (Participation in collective work.)
 
 
  (Participation in collective work.)
 
  (editor)
 
  (co-author)
  (Participation in collective work.)
  (Participación en obra colectiva.)
  (co-author)
  (Participation in collective work.)

Filmography

Documentaries
 2008, De Alpargatas. Historias de trabajo
 2005, Compañeras reinas

References

External links
 Mirta Lobato CV at National University of Tucumán

1948 births
Living people
People from Córdoba, Argentina
20th-century Argentine historians
21st-century Argentine historians
21st-century Argentine women writers
Argentine non-fiction writers
Argentine essayists
Gender studies academics